Conservis LLC is a Minneapolis-based company that provides enterprise resource planning software to farmers.

History
The company was founded in 2009 when four farmers asked Pat Christie and Eric Jackson for help with workflow management. Prior to this, the company was planning to enter the energy enterprise software and emissions trading sector but decided to not enter it due to the American Clean Energy and Security Act of 2009 not getting through the US Congress. Conservis is a Software as a Service (SaaS) company.

In July 2021, Conservis was acquired by the Dutch bank (Rabobank) and Canadian telecommunications company (Telus).

Business
Conservis has collaborated with Iteris to provide weather data and analytics to farmers.

References

Further reading
"Know Your Numbers" (5/3/21)
"Take the Guesswork Out of In-Field Applications" (2/10/21)
"Sustainability Through Traceability" (11/13/20)
"Using Tech to Understand Your Farm Operation" (8/31/20)
"Conservis: Solve Problems with Farm Management Software" 
"Can Ag-Tech + Fin-Tech Help Farmers Make Better Financial Decisions?" (12/7/18)
"Data-Driven Accuracy Translates to Dollars" (2/2/16)

External links

Agriculture companies of the United States
Companies based in Minneapolis
Software companies based in Minneapolis
Software companies based in Minnesota
2009 establishments in Minnesota
Software companies established in 2009
Software companies of the United States